The Liberal government of the United Kingdom of Great Britain and Ireland that began in 1905 and ended in 1915 consisted of two ministries: the first led by Henry Campbell-Bannerman (from 1905 to 1908) and the final three by H. H. Asquith (from 1908 onwards).


Formation
With the fall of Arthur Balfour's Conservative government in the United Kingdom in December 1905, the Liberals under Sir Henry Campbell-Bannerman were called in to form a government.  In the subsequent election, the Liberals won an enormous majority. Campbell-Bannerman was succeeded as prime minister by H. H. Asquith in 1908.

Policies

The Liberal government was supported by 29 Labour Party MPs. Chancellor David Lloyd George crafted the People's Budget and introduced a great deal of social legislation, such as old age pensions and unemployment insurance for a significant part of the working population. For many working people, for whom in old age the threat of the workhouse was very real, these represented a very significant change.  Equally groundbreaking was the Parliament Act 1911 which:
Removed the law-making veto from the House of Lords thus rendering it constitutionally most expedient to run any future government from the House of Commons
Enshrined into law the previous convention, which the Lords had broken in 1909, that the Lords may not reject Money Bills
Cut the length of Parliaments from seven years to five

Many of the members of Asquith's cabinet, however, opposed the social measures promulgated by leading figures such as Winston Churchill and David Lloyd George. This resistance was arguably a reflection of the extent to which many Liberals still adhered to the Party's Gladstonian, classical liberal tradition in spite of the growth of the "New Liberalism". Morley was opposed to both old-age pensions and the provisions of the Trade Boards Act of 1909, while Runciman was against the eight-hour day for miners and compensation for workers. Burns, Bryce, Loreburn, and W.S. Robson were opposed to land reform, insurance, and the feeding of schoolchildren, while several cabinet members (such as Crewe, Fitzmaurice, Harcourt, and McKenna) were critical of Lloyd George's progressive "People's Budget." Nevertheless, according to Neil Smith, the majority of the members of the Edwardian Liberal Cabinets were supportive of social reform and social progress. As noted by one study,

They (the Liberal Cabinet members) sought to respond to the discontent of the electorate by using the existing structure of government to correct the ills of society through innovative legislation. Two-thirds of the Liberal candidates, including Edwin Montagu, had pledged support for such measures during the campaign. While their support was often expressed in general terms, their intent was clear: Social and economic reform must be the first order of the new government.

Fate
Although the government lost a great deal of support by the two general elections of 1910, they managed to hold on by dint of support from the Irish Parliamentary Party.  After early mismanagement during the First World War, particularly the failure of the Dardanelles Campaign, Asquith was forced to bring the Unionists into the government in a coalition.

Cabinets

Campbell-Bannerman ministry

Sir Henry Campbell-Bannerman – Prime Minister, First Lord of the Treasury and Leader of the House of Commons
The Lord Loreburn – Lord Chancellor
The Earl of Crewe – Lord President of the Council
The Marquess of Ripon – Lord Privy Seal and Leader of the House of Lords
H. H. Asquith – Chancellor of the Exchequer
Herbert Gladstone – Secretary of State for the Home Department
Sir Edward Grey, Bt – Secretary of State for Foreign Affairs
The Earl of Elgin – Secretary of State for the Colonies
Richard Haldane – Secretary of State for War
John Morley – Secretary of State for India
The Lord Tweedmouth – First Lord of the Admiralty
David Lloyd George – President of the Board of Trade
Sir Henry Fowler – Chancellor of the Duchy of Lancaster
Sir John Sinclair – Secretary for Scotland
James Bryce – Chief Secretary for Ireland
John Burns – President of the Local Government Board
The Earl Carrington – President of the Board of Agriculture
Augustine Birrell – President of the Board of Education
Sydney Buxton – Postmaster-General

Changes
January 1907 – Augustine Birrell succeeds Bryce as Irish Secretary. Reginald McKenna succeeds Birrell at the Board of Education.
March 1907 – Lewis Harcourt, the First Commissioner of Works, enters the cabinet.

Asquith ministry

Changes
September 1908 – Lord Wolverhampton succeeds Lord Tweedmouth as Lord President. Lord FitzMaurice succeeds Lord Wolverhampton as Chancellor of the Duchy of Lancaster. 
October 1908 – Lord Crewe succeeds Lord Ripon as Lord Privy Seal and Leader of the House of Lords, while remaining also Colonial Secretary. 
June 1909 – Herbert Samuel succeeds Lord FitzMaurice at the Duchy of Lancaster.
February 1910 – Winston Churchill succeeds Herbert Gladstone as Home Secretary. Sydney Buxton succeeds Churchill at the Board of Trade. Herbert Samuel succeeds Buxton as Postmaster-General. Joseph Pease succeeds Samuel as Chancellor of the Duchy of Lancaster.
June 1910 – Lord Beauchamp succeeds Lord Wolverhampton as Lord President.
November 1910 – Lord Beauchamp succeeds Lewis Vernon Harcourt as First Commissioner of Public Works. Lord Morley of Blackburn succeeds Beauchamp as Lord President. Lord Crewe succeeds Morley as India Secretary, remaining also Lord Privy Seal. Lewis Harcourt succeeds Crewe as Colonial Secretary. 
October 1911 – Winston Churchill and Reginald McKenna switch offices, Churchill taking the Admiralty and McKenna the Home Office. Lord Carrington succeeds Lord Crewe as Lord Privy Seal. Crewe remains India Secretary. Walter Runciman succeeds Lord Carrington at the Board of Agriculture. Joseph Albert Pease succeeds Runciman at the Board of Education. Charles Edward Henry Hobhouse succeeds Pease at the Duchy of Lancaster.
February 1912 – Lord Crewe succeeds Lord Carrington as Lord Privy Seal, remaining also India Secretary. Thomas McKinnon Wood succeeds Lord Pentland as Secretary for Scotland.
June 1912 – The Attorney-General, Sir Rufus Isaacs, enters the cabinet. Lord Haldane succeeds Lord Loreburn as Lord Chancellor. Jack Seely succeeds Haldane as Secretary for War. 
October 1913 – Sir John Simon succeeds Sir Rufus Isaacs as Attorney-General.
February 1914 – John Burns succeeds Sydney Buxton as President of the Board of Trade. Herbert Samuel succeeds Burns at the Local Government Board. Sir Charles Edward Henry Hobhouse succeeds Samuel as Postmaster-General. Charles Frederick Gurney Masterman succeeds Hobhouse at the Duchy of Lancaster. 
March 1914 – Asquith temporarily succeeds Jack Seely as Secretary for War.
August 1914 – Lord Beauchamp succeeds Lord Morley as Lord President. Lord Emmott succeeds Beauchamp as First Commissioner of Public Works. Walter Runciman succeeds John Burns as President of the Board of Trade. Lord Lucas succeeds Runciman at the Board of Agriculture. Lord Kitchener succeeds Asquith as Secretary for War.
January 1915 – Edwin Samuel Montagu succeeds Charles Frederick Gurney Masterman as Chancellor of the Duchy of Lancaster.

List of ministers

Members of the cabinet are in bold face.

Notes

See also
 Edwardian era
 List of British governments

References

Further reading
 Blewett, Neal. Peers, the Parties and the People: General Elections of 1910 (1972).
 Brooks, David. The Age of Upheaval: Edwardian Politics, 1899-1914 (1995)
 Butler, David and Gareth Butler.  Twentieth Century British Political Facts, 1900–2000. (St. Martin's, 2000)
 Cross, Colin. The Liberals in Power, 1905-1914 (1963)  online
 Daglish, N. D. "A 'difficult and somewhat thankless task': politics, religion and the Education Bill of 1908." Journal of educational administration and history 31.1 (1999): 19–35.
 Gilbert, Bentley Brinkerhoff. "David Lloyd George: Land, The Budget, and Social Reform." American Historical Review 81.5 (1976): 1058–1066.
 Gilbert, Bentley B. "David Lloyd George: the reform of British landholding and the budget of 1914." Historical Journal 21.1 (1978): 117–141.
 Grigg, John. Lloyd George: The People's Champion, 1902–1911 (1978). biography
 Halévy, Elie.  History of the English People, 1905-1914 (1934), 686pp. a major political history
 Hay, James Roy. Origins of the Liberal Welfare Reforms, 1906–14 (1975) 78pp online
 Jenkins, Roy. Asquith: portrait of a man and an era (1964)
 Quinault, Roland. "Asquith's Liberalism." History 77.249 (1992): 33–49.
 Russell, A. K. Liberal landslide : the general election of 1906 (1973).
 Searle, G. R. A New England?: peace and war, 1886–1918 (Oxford UP, 2004), wide-ranging scholarly survey, 952 pp.

Primary sources and year books
 Annual Register 1906 
 Annual Register 1907 
 Statistical Abstract of the United Kingdom annual 1901–1909, online
 , 370pp

1905-1915
Government
1900s in British politics
1905 establishments in the United Kingdom
1910s in British politics
1915 disestablishments in the United Kingdom
Ministries of Edward VII
Ministries of George V
Cabinets established in 1905
Cabinets disestablished in 1915
H. H. Asquith
Henry Campbell-Bannerman